Andrea Nguyen (born 1969) is a Vietnamese-born, American teacher, food writer, cookbook author and chef living in the San Francisco area. An expert on Asian cuisine and cooking methods, Nguyen has written numerous cookbooks on the food of her native Vietnam, as well as an account of her family's escape during the Fall of Saigon. She writes an active blog, as well as articles for newspapers and food magazines and teaches cooking classes throughout the country.

Early life
Andrea Quynhgiao Nguyen was born in 1969 in Vietnam and fled with her family of seven when Saigon fell in 1975. Fleeing the communist regime, her family emigrated with only enough belongings for a vacation, but brought with them a notebook filled with her mother's recipes. They settled in Southern California and attempted to buy foods they were familiar with, but the dishes were mass produced and not very tasty. Nguyen's mother suggested they replicate foods from their homeland, by making the dishes themselves. After a childhood spent in San Clemente, Nguyen attended the University of Southern California and graduated with a B.S. in banking and finance and M.A. in communication management.

Career
Upon completing her schooling, Nguyen first worked as a bank auditor and then a university administrator, while she and husband, Rory O'Brien, were living in Santa Monica, before she began writing restaurant reviews. In 1997, she wrote her first book, an autobiographical tale, Trip to Freedom (1997) which was written to explain her family's migration and the events surrounding the decision to children. Nguyen wrote a letter to pitch an article on her mother's mooncakes to Saveur and they accepted it. She then developed her website and worked on a proposal for her first cookbook. She continued writing articles about the food of Vietnam in various newspapers and magazines, like the Los Angeles Times, Saveur, The Wall Street Journal, and Rodale's Organic Life. Starting fall 2017, she has had a monthly column in Cooking Light called "The Teacher."

Nguyen's first cookbook Into the Vietnamese Kitchen (2006) has been called "indispensable" for those wanting to cook Vietnamese foods, as Nguyen sees culinary history as integrally entwined with culture. Her detailed instructions were clear and precise with photographs and explanatory techniques provided in sidebar. It was a finalist in the 2007 James Beard Foundation Award, as best Asian cookbook and was nominated for best first book and best international cookbook by the International Association of Culinary Professionals that same year. In March 2012, both Into the Vietnamese Kitchen and Nguyen's second cookbook, Asian Dumplings were selected as two of seven cookbooks honored in the Asian section of Cooking Light′s Best 100 Cookbooks of the Past 25 Years Award. Asian Dumplings covered a wide array of dumplings from throughout Asia, dividing the recipes by dough and wrapping type. The detailed instructions included line drawings to demonstrate how to form the dough into traditional shapes, as well as sections on sauces, stocks,  seasonings and ingredients and various cooking equipment needed to make the dishes.

Asian Tofu (2012) was more than a guide to making tofu, as Nguyen included buying guides, as well as tips on selecting ready-made tofu. Her recipes featured both vegetarian and meat dishes, which could use either homemade or store-bought tofu and was noted as an "essential" guide. With The Banh Mi Handbook (2014), Nguyen added another layer to her history of cooking in Vietnam, showing how the marriage of French colonial staples, such as the baguette were combined with Asian pâtés, barbecue and pickles to create a "delightful balance of tastes and textures". Her 2017 book The Pho Cookbook explores variants in the dish, noting that traditionally pho was a simple, rustic soup, which mirrored the sensibility of Hanoi. As it made its way southward toward Saigon, the dish became sweeter and spicier and more cosmopolitan, with custom additions of sauces and herbs, representing the more capitalist influences of the commercialized south. In 2018, Nguyen won a James Beard Award for Best Cookbook for The Pho Cookbook.

Nguyen is a recognized authority on Asian cuisines and has taught cooking classes throughout the United States.

References

Citations

Bibliography

 

 

1969 births
Living people
Vietnamese chefs
Vietnamese women writers
Women cookbook writers
20th-century American women writers
20th-century Vietnamese women writers
21st-century American women writers
James Beard Foundation Award winners
21st-century Vietnamese women writers